Andrew Barnard Keith Lohrey (born 15 December 1939) is a former Australian politician.

Lohrey received a Bachelor of Arts and a PhD before entering politics. He was elected to the Tasmanian House of Assembly as a Labor member for Wilmot in 1972. He served as Speaker from 1979 to 1980 and also served as a minister, but he was defeated in 1986.

He is married to the author Amanda Lohrey.

References

1939 births
Living people
Members of the Tasmanian House of Assembly
Speakers of the Tasmanian House of Assembly
Australian Labor Party members of the Parliament of Tasmania